Manohara is the kinnari (half woman, half bird) heroine of one of the Jataka tales. Typically referred to as Manohara and Prince Sudhana, the legend appears in the Divyavadana and is documented by stone reliefs at Borobodur.

This story features in the folklore of Myanmar, Cambodia, Thailand, Laos, Sri Lanka, northern Malaysia and Indonesia. The Pannasjataka, Pali text written by a Buddhist monk/sage in Chiangmai around AD 1450–1470, also told the story of Sudhana and Manohara. There are also many similar versions told in China (where it is known as ), Japan, Korea, and Vietnam, including the Chinese story of the Princess and the Cowherd. In these stories, seven women who can fly descended to earth to take a bath, the youngest and prettiest of whom was captured by a human, and subsequently became a wife of a male human (either her captor or the prince-hero of the story). Later in the stories, the heroine put on some magical thing that enabled her to fly or transform into a bird, and flew away; prompting the quest by the hero in pursuit of his flying wife.

Synopsis
Manohara, the youngest of seven daughters of the Kimnara king, lives on Mount Kailash. One day, she travels to the human realm. She is caught by a hunter (using a magic noose in some versions) who gives her to Prince Sudhana. Son of King Adityavamsa and Queen Chandradevi, Sudhana is a renowned archer and heir to the Panchala kingdom. The prince falls in love with Manohara, and they get married.

Later, when the prince is away in battle, Manohara is accused by the royal counselor of bringing bad luck to the city and is threatened with death. She flies away, back to the Kimnara kingdom. She leaves behind a ring and the directions to reach the Kimnara kingdom so that Prince Sudhana can follow her.

Prince Sudhana returns to Panchala and follows her. From a hermit, he learns the language of animals to locate the Kimnara kingdom, and the necessary prayers to win back the princess. The journey takes seven years, seven months, and seven days. Along the way, Sudhana confronts a Yaksha (ogre), a river of flames, and a gigantic tree. After the long and arduous ordeal, he meets the Kimnara king who asks the prince to prove his sincerity with various tests assessing strength, perseverance, and wit. In the first test, Sudhana is made to lift a stone bench in the garden. The second task tested his skill with the bow and arrow. The final test is to identify which of seven identical women is Manohara, who he recognizes by the ring on her finger. Satisfied, the Kimnara king consents to their marriage and the couple returns to Panchala.

Adaptations
According to James R. Brandon, the story of Manohara is a popular theme in Southeast Asian theatre.

The tale of Manora was adapted as play in Burma (Myanmar), where the character was known as Mananhurry, one of the nine royal daughters that live in a silver mountain, located after "a belt of prickly cane", "a stream of liquid copper" and a "Beloo". Her future husband, Prince Sudhana, was translated as "Thoodanoo", the Prince of Pyentsa. In this version, the princesses fly by the use of an enchanted girdle, and the Manohara-like maiden is captured by a magical slipknot.

The characters of the tale are also known in Southeast Asia as Kev Monora and Prah Sothon.

The tale was also found in the Sanskrit Buddhist literature of Nepal, with the name Story of Suchandrima and a Kinnarí, where the main couple were named Mahonará and Sudhanusha. In another version from Nepal, Kinnarí Avadána, hunter Utpala captures a Kinnari (unnamed in the tale) with a magical noose. Prince Sudhana of Hastiná arrives with his hunting excursion and falls in love with the Kinnari.

Another translation named the prince as Sudhanu and the kinnari as Manohara, daughter of King Druma.

The tale is also known as Sithon and Manola in Laos.

Legacy
The story of Manohara and Prince Sudhana may have inspired the Manora type of drama dancing, performed in Thailand and Malaysia.

See also
 Swan maiden
 Kinnari
 Hagoromo (play)
 The Princess and the Cowherd
 Peacock Princess
 Menora, a dance-drama from Southeast Asia

References

Bibliography
 
 Schiefner, Anton; Ralston, William Shedden. Tibetan tales, derived from Indian sources. London, K. Paul, Trench, Trübner & co. ltd. 1906. pp. xlviii-l and 44–74.

Further reading

 
 
 
 
 
 
 
 

Buddhist legendary creatures
Cambodian legendary creatures
Thai legendary creatures
Laotian legendary creatures
Sri Lankan legendary creatures
Burmese legendary creatures
Indonesian legendary creatures
Indian legendary creatures
Indian folklore
Indian literature
Indian fairy tales
Indian legends